Latham is a city in Butler County, Kansas, United States.  As of the 2020 census, the population of the city was 96.

History
Latham was laid out in 1885. It may have been named for Latham Young, a railroad official.

A post office was opened in Bodock (an extinct town) in 1883, but it was moved to Latham in 1885.

The first newspaper in Latham was founded in 1901.

Geography
Latham is located at  (37.535363, -96.641781).

Demographics

2010 census
As of the census of 2010, there were 139 people, 61 households, and 36 families living in the city. The racial makeup of the city was 96.4% White, 1.4% Native American, and 2.2% from two or more races. Hispanic or Latino of any race were 2.2% of the population.

There were 61 households, of which 31.1% had children under the age of 18 living with them, 42.6% were married couples living together, 9.8% had a female householder with no husband present, 6.6% had a male householder with no wife present, and 41.0% were non-families. 37.7% of all households were made up of individuals, and 6.5% had someone living alone who was 65 years of age or older. The average household size was 2.28 and the average family size was 2.86.

The median age in the city was 43.3 years. 26.6% of residents were under the age of 18; 4.4% were between the ages of 18 and 24; 20.9% were from 25 to 44; 35.3% were from 45 to 64; and 12.9% were 65 years of age or older. The gender makeup of the city was 51.1% male and 48.9% female.

2000 census
As of the census of 2000, there were 164 people, 65 households, and 41 families living in the city. The racial makeup of the city was 93.90% White, 0.61% Native American, and 5.49% from two or more races. Hispanic or Latino of any race were 0.61% of the population.

There were 65 households, out of which 33.8% had children under the age of 18 living with them, 52.3% were married couples living together, 7.7% had a female householder with no husband present, and 35.4% were non-families. 32.3% of all households were made up of individuals, and 10.8% had someone living alone who was 65 years of age or older. The average household size was 2.52 and the average family size was 3.17.

In the city, the population was spread out, with 34.1% under the age of 18, 6.1% from 18 to 24, 30.5% from 25 to 44, 20.1% from 45 to 64, and 9.1% who were 65 years of age or older. The median age was 32 years. For every 100 females, there were 105.0 males. For every 100 females age 18 and over, there were 116.0 males.

The median income for a household in the city was $35,417, and the median income for a family was $42,292. Males had a median income of $33,750 versus $25,536 for females. The per capita income for the city was $13,385. About 12.8% of families and 21.7% of the population were below the poverty line, including 33.3% of those under the age of eighteen and 66.7% of those 65 or over.

Education
The community is served by Bluestem USD 205 public school district.

Latham High School was closed through school unification. The Latham High School mascot was Crusaders.

References

Further reading

External links

 Latham - Directory of Public Officials
 Latham City Map, KDOT

Cities in Kansas
Cities in Butler County, Kansas
Wichita, KS Metropolitan Statistical Area